Silver Palm may be any of the following:

 Several different palm trees in the genus Coccothrinax, including:
 Coccothrinax argentata - Silver palm, Florida silver palm or Silver thatch palm,
 Coccothrinax argentea - Hispaniolan silver palm or Silver thatch palm,
 Coccothrinax barbadensis - Silver palm, Barbados silver palm or Lesser Antilles silver thatch palm,
 Coccothrinax jamaicensis - Jamaican silver thatch palm,
 Coccothrinax litoralis - Cuban silver palm,
 Coccothrinax readii - Mexican silver palm,
 Coccothrinax scoparia - Haitian mountain silver palm, 
 Coccothrinax spissa - Swollen silver thatch palm.
 Silver Palm, Florida - A former populated place in southern Miami-Dade County, Florida.
Silver Palm Drive.
Silver Palm Schoolhouse.
 The Silver Palm, a passenger train formerly operated by Amtrak.
 The Silver Palm is an award in the Boy Scouts of America.